Rock It is an Australian music festival held at the Arena Joondalup in the northern suburbs of Perth, Western Australia. The festival was first held in 1999, and mainly features modern rock music. Along with the nationally-touring Big Day Out, Rock It was one of the major rock concerts held regularly in Perth.

At the March 2009 event Western Australian Police trialled the use of drug amnesty bins for the first time at a rock concert. The police restrictions resulted in long queues on entry and due to their public visibility little use by concert goers.

Artist lineups by year

1999
5 December 1999

 Silverchair
 Powderfinger
 Beaverloop
 John Butler Trio
 Killing Heidi
 Jebediah
 Test Eagles
 Auto Pilot
 DJ Kingsize
 Kenny Bartley
 DJ Betamax
 DJ Dr Love
 Fourstroke

2000
22 October 2000

 Green Day
 Powderfinger
 Grinspoon
 28 Days
 Shihad
 John Butler Trio
 Weta

2002
13 October 2002

 Grinspoon
 John Butler Trio
 Pacifier
 Machine Gun Fellatio
 Motorace
 Bodyjar
 Superheist
 The Fergusons
 Spencer Tracy

2003
23 November 2003

 Jack Johnson
 Powderfinger
 The Living End
 John Butler Trio
 Magic Dirt
 Gyroscope
 Downsyde

2004

14 March 2004
 Grinspoon
 Pacifier
 Resin Dogs
 Bodyjar
 The Butterfly Effect
 Brand New
 After the Fall
 The Flairz

Blink-182 was scheduled, but cancelled due to drummer Travis Barker breaking an ankle.

24 October 2004
 Jet
 The Living End
 Spiderbait
 Hilltop Hoods
 Jebediah
 28 Days
 Rocket Science
 The Casanovas
 Dallas Crane
 Cooker and Love
 Ground Components

This festival, featuring an all-Australian line up, was the first Rock It to sell out.

2005

13 March 2005
 Green Day (As part of the American Idiot World Tour)
 Grinspoon
 Simple Plan
 Shihad
 Frenzal Rhomb
 End of Fashion
 Little Birdy
 Scribe
 The Spazzys
 The Flairz
 Faker
 Day of the Dead
 Mr Sandman
 The Fuzz

4 December 2005
 Foo Fighters
 Oasis
 Spiderbait
 Wolfmother
 Kaiser Chiefs
 Gyroscope
 Karnivool
 The Pictures

2006
19 March 2006
 Silverchair
 Grinspoon
 Shihad
 Cog
 Butterfingers
 Faker
 After the Fall
 The Hot Lies
 Snowman
 Katalyst
 Koolism
 Fdel
 Ru.C.L.
 Nathan J

2009
8 March 2009
 Kings of Leon
 The Fratellis
 The Music
 Birds of Tokyo
 Faker
 The Stills
 Sparkadia
 Sugar Army
 Bob Log III
 The Devil
 Abbe May

2012
28 October 2012
 The Black Keys
 John Butler Trio
 Birds of Tokyo
 The Panics
 Lanie Lane
 Last Dinosaurs
 San Cisco
 The Kill Devil Hills
 Abbe May
 Royal Headache
 Graveyard Train
 Brothers Grim
 The Toot Toot Toots
 Emperors

Spin-off events

Blackjack 2007
The 2007 event renamed Blackjack 2007 as Arena Joondalup was unable to host the event, so the festival was held at the Claremont Showground on 5 April 2007.
 The Pixies
 The Living End
 Eskimo Joe
 Gnarls Barkley
 The Vines
 Birds of Tokyo
 Children Collide

On The Bright Side festival

On The Bright Side is an annual Australian music festival held in Perth, Western Australia. Starting in 2010, the event is the result of collaboration between the promoters of Splendour in the Grass Festival held in Woodford, Queensland  and Rock-It held in Joondalup, Western Australia. In 2012, the festival was cancelled due to "conflicting artist schedules".

References

External links
Rock It - Official website

Music in Perth, Western Australia
Rock festivals in Australia
Music festivals established in 1999